Varsity Field is a baseball venue located on the campus of Binghamton University in Vestal, New York, United States.  The field is home to the  team of the NCAA Division I America East Conference.  The field holds a capacity of 1,000 spectators. In 2010, the field hosted the America East Conference baseball tournament.

Following the 2011 season, plans for renovations to the facility were announced.  The additions and improvements, which were scheduled to be completed prior to the 2012 season, included stadium seating, bullpens, a press box, a PA system, dugouts, and a batter's eye. Due to construction delays, however, the Bearcats were unable to play any 2012 games at the field.  The team played the majority of its games on the road and used the Binghamton Mets' NYSEG Stadium and Cornell University's Hoy Field for their seven home games.

See also
 List of NCAA Division I baseball venues

References

External links
 Baseball Complex

College baseball venues in the United States
Sports venues in New York (state)
Sports venues in Broome County, New York
Binghamton Bearcats baseball
Baseball venues in New York (state)